Sir Edward Thomas Holden (10 September 1831 – 13 November 1926) was a British businessman and Liberal Party politician, who was briefly Member of Parliament (MP) for Walsall.

Biography
Holden was born in Walsall, Staffordshire, and was the son of Edward Holden and his wife Elizabeth née Mason of New York City. Following a private education, he joined the firm of tanners and curriers in the town founded by his father, eventually becoming the head of the company. In 1854, he married Caroline Glass of Edinburgh. They made their home at Glenelg, Great Barr, and had one son.

He was elected to Walsall Borough Council, of which he was a member for more than sixty years. He was mayor of Walsall on three occasions: in 1870/71, 1871/72 and 1904/05. He was also a member of Walsall School Board and Board of Guardians, and a justice of the peace for the borough of Walsall and the county of Staffordshire.

In July 1891, the sitting Liberal member of parliament for Walsall, Sir Charles Forster, died suddenly. Holden, who was a close friend of the late MP and president of Walsall Liberal Association, was unanimously adopted to contest the resulting by-election. Holden campaigned on a platform of opposing the incumbent Conservative government and was in favour of Irish Home Rule, "one man - one vote" and the introduction of elected parish councils. He also had the support of the local temperance movement, as he was in favour of the closure of licensed premises on Sundays. His Conservative opponent was Frank James, who was supported by the Licensed Vintners National Defence League.

The by-election was held on 11 August and Holden successfully held the seat for the Liberals with a majority of 539 votes. It was believed he was helped by the presence of 1,000 Irish voters in the constituency.

Holden's membership of the Commons was to be brief: a general election was held in 1892. Holden's opponent of the previous year, Frank James, was able to gain the seat for the Conservatives. Although James was subsequently unseated on petition in August 1892 due to breaches of Corrupt Practices Act 1883, Holden did not choose to claim the seat. Indeed, he stated that he would "not again offer himself for Walsall or any other place". However, he continued to be involved in Walsall politics at a municipal level. He was knighted in 1907.

In 1916 Holden was a signatory on a successful  application to the charity commission by Ruiton Congregational Chapel in Upper Gornal in the Parish of Sedgley in the then county of Stafford. It is understood that Holden was a member of the church.

Holden died in November 1926, aged 95.

His younger brother, James Alexander Holden (1835–1887) emigrated to South Australia and founded a family saddlery business which became the company which manufactured the Holden automobile.

References

External links 
 

1831 births
1926 deaths
Liberal Party (UK) MPs for English constituencies
UK MPs 1886–1892
People from Walsall
People from Great Barr